Kosmos 5 ( meaning Cosmos 5), also known as 2MS #2 and occasionally in the West as Sputnik 15 was a scientific research and technology demonstration satellite launched by the Soviet Union in 1962. It was the fifth satellite to be designated under the Kosmos system, and the third spacecraft to be launched as part of the MS programme, after Kosmos 2 and Kosmos 3. Its primary missions were to develop systems for future satellites, and to record data about artificial radiation around the Earth.

Spacecraft
Kosmos 5 was a 2MS satellite, the second of two to be launched, following the first which was launched as Kosmos 3 on 24 April 1962. The 2MS was the second of two types of MS satellite to be launched, following the first 1MS spacecraft which had been launched as Kosmos 2. Kosmos 5 was the penultimate MS satellite to be launched, and the last to successfully reach orbit. The last launch attempt, of a 1MS satellite, occurred on 25 October 1962, and failed to reach orbit. It had a mass of 280 kg.

Mission
It was launched aboard Kosmos-2I 63S1 s/n 3LK. It was the sixth flight of the Kosmos-2I, and the fourth to successfully reach orbit. The launch was conducted from Mayak-2 at Kapustin Yar, and occurred at 03:07:00 GMT on 28 May 1962. It decayed on 2 May 1963, after nearly a year in orbit.

Kosmos 5 was among several satellites inadvertently damaged or destroyed by the Starfish Prime high-altitude nuclear test on 9 July 1962 and subsequent radiation belt.

See also

 1962 in spaceflight

References

Spacecraft launched in 1962
1962 in the Soviet Union
Kosmos 0005
Spacecraft which reentered in 1963